The Deperdussin 1912 Racing Monoplane was a French aircraft built by Société de Production des Aéroplanes Deperdussin especially for racing. It is notable for being the first aircraft to exceed  in level flight.

Design and development
The Deperdussin 1912 Racer, was a high-wing monoplane with wings which were tapered so that their chord was greater at the tips (1.60 m wide) than at the root (1.30 m wide), this producing better wing-warping for lateral control. The fuselage consisted of a wooden box-girder entirely skinned with plywood, with the rounded top and bottom built up from laminations of wood. 

It was powered by a  Gnome double Omega 14-cylinder twin-row rotary engine .

It was first flown late in 1911 or early in 1912; Jules Védrines is recorded as making "fast flights" in the aircraft on 2 January 1912.

It is probable that this aircraft was the one being flown by Védrines when he crashed at Épinay on 29 April during an attempt to fly from Brussels to Madrid in a single day.

Specifications (first example)

References

1912
1910s French sport aircraft
Mid-wing aircraft
Aircraft first flown in 1911
Rotary-engined aircraft